City Centre Me'aisem is a shopping mall located in Dubai, United Arab Emirates, and it is the fourth mall owned by Majid Al Futtaim Properties operating in Dubai and the sixth mall operating in the United Arab Emirates.

The mall opened on 1 September 2015 and it serves as community mall located in International Media Production Zone, near the intersection of Al Khail Road and Shaikh Mohammand Bin Zayed Road.

Construction
The mall was built with an investment of AED 275 million by Majid Al Futtaim Group. Phase 2, where the expansion of the mall may be completed by 2020.

References

External links
 Official Press Release

See also
 Mall of the Emirates
 Deira City Centre
 Mirdiff City Centre

Shopping malls in Dubai
Shopping malls established in 2015